Zygmunt Wiehler (10 February 1890, Kraków, Austria-Hungary –26 December 1977, Warsaw) was a Polish popular and film music composer and director.

Wiehler attended the Music Conservatory in Kraków. From 1907 he was connected professionally to many theaters in the country, and in the 1920s and 1930s, he was a musical manager and director in Warsaw cabarets ("Wodewil", "Qui pro quo", "Banda", "Perskie Oko", "Morskie Oko", "Ananas", "Wielka Rewia", "Cyganeria"). He prepared music to be presented under the theatrical director Leon Schiller. During 1935-39 he was the musical manager of Feliks Parnell's Ballet. At the dance festival during the 1936 Olympics in Berlin he shared in a medal for the Parnell Ballet.  At the start of the occupation (1939–40) he played piano in Warsaw cafés, then (1940–44) directed in public theaters. After the war, he divided his time between Łódź and Warsaw theaters. At the end of the 1950s he turned to his own composing. He wrote nearly a thousand songs, of which many became hits. 
He is buried in Powązki Cemetery (Section 287-VI-9/10).

Film music
Profesor Wilczur
Ada! To nie wypada! (1936)
Książątko
Ulan ksiecia Józefa (1938)
 The Three Hearts (1939)
Złota maska (1940)
W chłopskie ręce (1946)
Harmonia (1947)
Sprawa do załatwienia (1953)

Operetta
Gwiazda Kaukazu
Niebieski ptak

Ballet music
Dożynki, Lajkonik
Umarł Maciek umarł
Wesele łowickie

Other music
Tomasz, skąd ty to masz
Niebieski walc
Maleńki znak

External links
Post-war film work in Polish.
Interia entry in Polish.

Polish composers
Polish film score composers
Male film score composers
Burials at Powązki Cemetery
1890 births
1977 deaths
20th-century composers
20th-century male musicians